Tarkulaha is a village development committee in Rupandehi District in Lumbini Province of Southern Nepal. At the time of the 1991 Nepal census it had a population of 3290 people living in 533 individual households.

References

Populated places in Rupandehi District